Survivor Pakistan was Pakistan's version of the popular show Survivor. The show only ran for one season that aired from August to November 2006. Due to the culture of Pakistan, only men were allowed to take part in this season which caused some protest within Pakistan. Unlike most seasons of Survivor that take place in relatively warm conditions, this season took place in a cold secluded mountain range in Pakistan. The contestants this season were split into two tribes, the Ishkuman tribe, and the Karambar tribe. During the pre-merge portion of the season, the Karambar tribe proved to be the stronger of the two tribes, winning four of the six immunity challenges. Following the merge, the former Ishkuman tribe members were on the outs and were voted out of the merged tribe before most of the former Karambar members. The finalists for this season were Ahmed Wali, Abdul Waheed, Ali Asghar, and Muhammad Ziad with the winner being Muhammad Ziad. Due to the low ratings this season received; the series was discontinued.

Finishing order

External links
 https://web.archive.org/web/20071220203119/http://dewsurvivorpak.com.pk/ep-guide.html (Official Website Archive Episode Guide)
 https://web.archive.org/web/20080219093842/http://dewsurvivorpak.com.pk/cast.html (Cast Profiles)

Pakistan
Pakistani reality television series
2006 Pakistani television series debuts
2006 Pakistani television series endings
Television shows filmed in Pakistan
Pakistani television series based on non-Pakistani television series